Dr Katharine Stephanie Benedicta Keats-Rohan (born 1957) is a British history researcher, specialising in prosopography. She has produced seminal work on early European history, and collaborated with, among others, Christian Settipani. Keats-Rohan is widely regarded as one of the founders of modern prosopographical and network analysis research, which has become highly computer-dependent.

Works
1997: (Ed.) Family Trees and the Roots of Politics: the Prosopography of Britain and France from the Tenth to the Twelfth Century. Woodbridge, Suffolk: Boydell Press
1997: Domesday Names: an Index of Latin Personal and Place Names in Domesday Book; with David Thornton
1999: Domesday People: a Prosopography of Persons Occurring in English Documents, 1066–1166. I. Domesday Book Woodbridge, Suffolk: Boydell Press
1999: Prosopography of Post-Conquest England: the Continental Origin of English Landowners, 1066–1166
2000: Onomastique et Parenté dans l'Occident médiéval; with Christian Settipani
2002: Domesday Descendants: a Prosopography of Persons Occurring in English Documents, 1066–1166. II
2002: Resourcing Sources: Texts, Technology and Prosopography
2006: The Cartulary of the Abbey of Mont-Saint-Michel; with Shaun Tyas
2007: Prosopography Approaches and Applications: a Handbook (Prosopographica et Genealogica)

References

External links
 Prosopography – resource development, Faculty of History, University of Oxford

1957 births
Living people
British historians
British medievalists
Women medievalists
Fellows of Linacre College, Oxford
Place of birth missing (living people)
British women historians